The Women's downhill competition of the 2022 Winter Paralympics was held at the Yanqing National Alpine Skiing Centre on 5 March 2022.

Medal table

Visually impaired
In the downhill visually impaired, the athlete with a visual impairment has a sighted guide. The two skiers are considered a team, and dual medals are awarded.

Standing

Sitting

See also
Alpine skiing at the 2022 Winter Olympics

References

Women's downhill
Para